Kafr Rumah (also spelled Kafrumah or Kfar Ruma) is a town in northwestern Syria, administratively part of the Maarrat al-Nu'man District of the Idlib Governorate. According to the Syria Central Bureau of Statistics, Kafr Rumah had a population of 12,276 in the 2004 census. Its inhabitants are predominantly Sunni Muslims. Nearby localities include Hass, Syria and Kafr Nabl to the west, Sarjah to the north, Maarrat al-Nu'man to the east and Hish to the south.

History
Kafr Rumah contains ancient ruins. Among them is a bridge consisting of slabs built on ten pillars instead of the typical style of Roman and Byzantine-era bridges in the Levant and elsewhere, which are supported by arches.

According to the 13th century Muslim scholar Yaqut al-Hamawi, Kafar Ruma was: "A village of Ma'arrah an Nu'man. It was  once a celebrated fortress, but was ruined by Lulu as Saifi, who conquered Halab in 393 (1003)".

References

Bibliography

Populated places in Maarat al-Numan District
Archaeological sites in Idlib Governorate
Populated places in Jabal Zawiya